is a passenger railway station located in the town of Yokoze, Saitama, Japan, operated by the private railway operator Seibu Railway.

Lines

Station layout
The station consists of one island platform serving two tracks, connected to the station building by a level crossing.

History
The station opened on 14 October 1969. A new station building was completed in 1992.

Station numbering was introduced on all Seibu Railway lines during fiscal 2012, with Yokoze Station becoming "SI35".

Passenger statistics
In fiscal 2019, the station was the 85th busiest on the Seibu network with an average of 1712 passengers daily. The passenger figures for previous years are as shown below.

Surrounding area
 
Yokoze Town Hall
Yokoze History and Culture Museum
Yokoze Post Office
Yokoze River

See also
 List of railway stations in Japan

References

External links

  

Seibu Ikebukuro Line
Railway stations in Saitama Prefecture
Railway stations in Japan opened in 1969
Stations of Seibu Railway
Yokoze, Saitama